John Logan may refer to:

Literature
 John Logan (minister) (1748–1788), Scottish poet and minister at Leith
 John Logan (poet) (1923–1987), American poet and educator
 John Logan (writer) (born 1961), American screenwriter and playwright
 John Logan, a fictional character in Ian McEwan's 1997 novel Enduring Love and its 2004 film adaptation

Military
 SS John A. Logan or USS Alnitah (AK-127), American US Navy ship in service during the Second World War
 John Logan (pioneer) (1747–1807), Indian fighter and first treasurer of the U.S. state of Kentucky
 John A. Logan (John Alexander Logan, 1826–1886),  American soldier and politician
 John Alexander Logan Jr. (1865–1899), American United States Army major; posthumous Medal of Honor award

Music
 John "Juke" Logan (1946–2013), American blues harmonica player and songwriter

Sport
 John Logan (American football) (1891–1977), American football player
 John Logan (footballer, born 1912) (1912–1980), English football wing-half for Darlington, Barnsley and Sheffield Wednesday
 John Logan (footballer, born 1871) (1871–after 1896), Scottish football outside-left for Partick Thistle and Small heath

Others
 John Logan (judge) (born 1956), Australian judge of the Federal Court of Australia
 Paddy Logan (politician) (born John William Logan, 1845–1925), civil engineering contractor and British Member of Parliament
 John R. Logan (born 1946), American sociologist

See also
 Jack Logan (disambiguation)
 Johnny Logan (disambiguation)
 Logan (surname)